Edinburgh Arena is a proposed indoor arena and conference centre. The venue would have a capacity of 8,000 seats.

Edinburgh is the only capital city in Europe with no high capacity music venue. In 2019, Lothian Leisure Development and NEC Group published a proposal to build a large music venue and conference space in the city. The OVO Hydro in Glasgow hosts a maximum capacity of just over 14,300, and Aberdeen's P&J Live once hosted an event with 15,000 attendees.

The location of the current proposal for an 'Edinburgh Arena' is a 30 acre site in greenbelt land near Loanhead.

References 

Proposed indoor arenas
Proposed buildings and structures in Scotland
Music venues in Edinburgh